Alexander Black Robertson (1847–1920) was a Canadian farmer and Ontario political figure. He represented Waterloo North in the Legislative Assembly of Ontario as a Liberal member from 1894 to 1898.

He was born 7 July 1847 in Wellesley Township, Waterloo County. His parents were Scottish immigrants.

References 

The Canadian parliamentary companion, 1897 JA Gemmill
Member's parliamentary history for the Legislative Assembly of Ontario

1847 births
1920 deaths
Ontario Liberal Party MPPs
People from the Regional Municipality of Waterloo
Canadian people of Scottish descent